Baleno was the name of at least two ships of the Italian Navy and may refer to:

 , a  launched in 1931 and sunk in 1942.
 , a patrol boat launched in 1964 and retired in 1985.

Italian Navy ship names